The Beacon School (also called Beacon High School) is a highly-selective college-preparatory public high school in the Hell's Kitchen area of Manhattan in New York City near Times Square and the Theater District.  Beacon's curriculum exceeds the standards set by the New York State Regents, and as a member of the New York Performance Standards Consortium, its students are exempt from taking most Regents exams. Instead, students present performance-based projects at the end of each semester to panels of teachers. In 2019, the school received roughly 6,000 applications for 360 ninth-grade seats, yielding an acceptance rate of approximately 6.2%. Beacon is ranked 45th within New York State and 382th nationwide by U.S. News.

Beacon has a Stock Market Club, Debate Team, Model Congress, Model UN, Math Club, newspaper (The Beacon Beat), Beacon Drama Arts Theater (B'DAT), Film Club, Photo Club, Arts Committee, Senior Committee, Yearbook, Beacon Ink Literary Magazine, Live Poet's Society, Student Leadership Team and Student Government.

Beacon was founded in 1993 as an alternative to the Regents Exam-based testing system in favor of portfolio-based assessment. The school's purpose was also purportedly to keep class sizes down and total student population at, or just above, one thousand students. Over time, Beacon was forced to accept certain aspects of the Regents-based testing curriculum, and to abandon its portfolio-assessment system as the sole method of graduation, which had been the case until mid-1999. Beacon now utilizes, in its own words, "traditional testing ... [but] our students' progress is largely assessed through performance-based projects, completed individually and in groups. To graduate, students must present their best work to panels of teachers."

Academics

Overview

The class schedule at the Beacon School is organized in bands, designated by letters A through H.  As a Beacon student advances in grade level, they are gradually given more opportunity to choose classes of their choice in the subject area of the band in question, rather than relying on their stream to do the selecting. This is both a preparatory measure for the university system of class selection, where students are permitted to select all their classes themselves on an individual basis, as well as a means of allowing students the ability to find what interests them among the course offerings.

Beacon also offers several Advanced Placement courses.  AP courses are currently available for biology, calculus, physics, and Spanish. Students take the Advanced Placement exam at the end of the course, and have an opportunity to attain college credits.

In-school requirements

Though the yearly schedule is broken into two semesters, these are not standard United States college semesters. Most academic classes are year-long courses, so students generally return to their classes with the same teachers for the second semester. Students have the opportunity to change electives at the end of each semester. Certain science courses are offered to students on a per-semester basis.

Internships and community service

The school does not require its students to do internships, but internship opportunities are available for those that want to pursue them. A minimum of 50 hours of community service hours is a strictly enforced graduation requirement, and can be fulfilled however a student likes, as long as they clear the work with a community service leader in writing before beginning it. The community service program is led by a faculty advisor but taught by a group of dedicated 11th and 12th graders called "The Community Service Leadership Team". This group of students plan lessons and activities to get lowerclassmen excited about community service placements across the city at non-profits such as the Added Value Farm in Red Hook, Brooklyn and Community Voices Heard in East Harlem.

Beacon states:

Every tenth grader (15-16 year old) at the Beacon School takes the Community Service class in either the Fall or Spring semester. We try to provide internships that are educational for students and at the same time meaningful for the community. Beacon students reflect on their experience in written journals and in a weekly classroom seminar.

Beacon students are expected to work five hours per week over a semester (about 4 months) in a site that they select" but they may complete the hours through the course of 1 year. They may negotiate any work schedule that is convenient to themselves and their community service site. A total of 50 hours is required for passing credit in the course. Students who complete 75 hours are eligible for "honors" credit.

Campus

1993 to 2015
For its first two years, The Beacon School was located inside Fordham University's Lincoln Center Campus. It also utilized John Jay College of Criminal Justice's facilities for physical education.  From 1995 to 2015, the school had been located three blocks from Jay, at 227 West 61st Street, a former warehouse completed in 1919, alongside the Amsterdam Houses, a group of New York City Housing Authority projects.   The Beacon School location has been replaced by West End Secondary School.  It was in an area with many other schools, including Public School 191 and Abraham Joshua Heschel School across the street.

2015 to Present

As of September, 2015, Beacon occupies a seven-story building located at 522 West 44th Street, between 10th and 11th avenues. The building, previously  used as a book warehouse by the New York Public Library was sold to the School Construction Authority for $45 million in August, 2011. Construction began in August, 2012, with a ground breaking ceremony attended by high-ranking city officials including City Council Speaker Christine Quinn, Department of Education Chancellor Dennis Walcott, and Mayor Michael Bloomberg. The building, built by Skanska USA for $88 million, houses a full-sized cafeteria, black-box theater, dance studio, auditorium, film lab, and library, with writing labs, art studios, and study spaces throughout the building.

Culture

The Beacon School offers extracurricular activities such as after school theater and studio stage crew, book club, a rock climbing club, a dance club, a Live Poets Society, Entrepreneurship club, art club, music performance, a photo club, a Senior Committee (populated by seniors who are responsible for helping with plans for graduation and the annual senior trip),  and a Model United Nations club. The Beacon School has a debate team. Beacon has had a Student Government since 2016, with SG student members representing student voice in the School Leadership Team. The school also features numerous social justice clubs and affinity groups, such as Black Student Union, Muslim Student Union, Asian Student Union, Integrate Beacon, Young Democratic Socialists, and more. It features charity clubs, such as Project ABLE, which raises money for libraries in Africa, and the Kids for Kids Club, which raises money for local and nonlocal causes.

In 2007 the school made front page news after David Andreatta confirmed that the school took illegal trips to Cuba. At the end of the school year the teacher involved, Nathan Turner, resigned. In 2005, then Lieutenant Governor Paterson sent his daughter on one such trip. Alumni reaction to the trips was mixed, with some alumni continuing to be involved in activism, while others have expressed frustration with the liberal leanings of their teachers and peers.

Educational travel has become an important part of the educational culture. Past destinations included India, Cuba, Spain, England, Ireland, Venezuela, France, Sweden, Costa Rica, Mexico, Mozambique, South Africa, and New Orleans.

Athletics
The Beacon School offers an array of athletic teams for its students. Sports including fencing, softball, track, wrestling, bowling, basketball, Ultimate, soccer, cross country, and tennis form a part of the culture at Beacon. 
In 2014, Beacon's tennis team won the national tennis championship as a result of taking first place at the All-American Invitational Boys Tennis Tournament in Corona del Mar, California. Because the school does not have a practice space of its own, the school uses many of the city's public access facilities. In addition, the boys baseball team advanced to the 2019 Public School Athletic League (PSAL) AAA championship game. The game was played in Yankee Stadium on June 4 and The Beacon School lost to Gregorio Luperon HS for Science and Math with a final score of four to five.

On November 7, 2019, both the boys soccer program and the girls soccer program became city champions by defeating John Adams High School and Brooklyn Tech respectively. The games were played at Belson Stadium on the campus of St. John's University in Queens. As a result, the Beacon boys soccer team was ranked #9 in New York State and has since continued to remain one of the strongest programs in New York City.

Model United Nations 

Beacon's Model United Nations debates solutions to international issues, and attends conferences within New York City, as well as throughout the United States.

In 2016, Beacon's delegation placed first among 174 schools from over 30 countries in the Global Classrooms Model United Nations conference. The conference, held annually at United Nations Headquarters, is sponsored by the United Nations Association of the United States in collaboration with the Lebanese American University.

Since 2016, Beacon's Model United Nations program has been cited at the top of Best Delegate's annual list of the world's best high school Model UN teams. The rankings, calculated based on data aggregated from the 30 most competitive Model UN conferences in North America, divide teams into groups by region and overall standing. Beacon is ranked in the Top 25 Overall category, the highest level of recognition awarded by the publication.

Transportation
Additionally, New York City Bus's  routes stop near Beacon. Students residing a certain distance from the school are provided full-fare or half-fare student MetroCards for public transportation at the start of each term, based on how far away the student resides from the school.

Student demographics
, student demographics were as follows: 48.7% White, 22.8% Hispanic, 13.5% Black, 9% Asian, Two Races 5.7%. Approximately 65 out of 100 students are female. Students commute from all boroughs of New York City, however the plurality of students reside in Manhattan and Brooklyn. The school has experienced a significant decline in the number of Black and Hispanic students since its founding due to changes in the admissions policy.

Notable alumni

 Elizabeth Acevedo, poet, novelist
 Xiye Bastida, climate justice activist.
 Jay Critch, rapper.
 Daphne Frias, climate, disability justice and gun violence activist
 Laundry Day, American pop rock band formed in 2018.
 Alex Rando, American soccer player for New York City FC II in the MLS Next Pro.

See also

 Education in New York City
 List of high schools in New York City
 Public Schools Athletic League
Gifted education

References
Notes

External links

Official website
DOE Website
Athletic Profile
InsideSchools Profile 

 
Educational institutions established in 1993
Public high schools in Manhattan
1993 establishments in New York City
Gifted education